Garnett Farm Historic District, also known as Ott Farm, is a historic home and farm and national historic district located near Centertown, Cole County, Missouri.  It encompasses 11 contributing buildings, 2 contributing sites, 2 contributing structures, and 1 contributing object dated between about 1860 and 1965.  They include the farmhouse (c. 1890), garage (c. 1920), smokehouse (c. 1840), outhouse (c. 1900), well house (c. 1940), bull barn, bank barn (c. 1876), milk house (1952), cattle barn (1905-1906), tack room (c. 1900), grain bin (c. 1930), Garnett barn (1910), silo (1946); water pump, and a cemetery.  The farmhouse is a two-story brick residence with some Georgian Revival and Italianate style features.

It was listed on the National Register of Historic Places in 2016.

References

Historic districts on the National Register of Historic Places in Missouri
Farms on the National Register of Historic Places in Missouri
Italianate architecture in Missouri
Georgian Revival architecture in Missouri
Buildings and structures in Cole County, Missouri
National Register of Historic Places in Cole County, Missouri